Jeanjean may refer to:

 Red French wine variety Bouchalès

People with the surname
Léolia Jeanjean, French tennis player 
Michel Jeanjean, Administrator Superior of Wallis and Futuna
Nicolas Jeanjean, French rugby union footballer
Paul Jeanjean, French clarinet composer
Thomas Jeanjean, Accounting professor 
 Maurice Jeanjean, French musician, composer (1897–1968)
 Faustin Jeanjean, French musician, composer (1900–1979)